Popular Music from Vittula is a novel by Mikael Niemi. It was published in Sweden in 2000, the English translation by Laurie Thompson followed in 2003. A film based on the book was released in 2004.

The book won the 2000 August Prize.

References

2000 Swedish novels
August Prize-winning works
Novels set in Norrbotten
Swedish-language novels
Novels set in Sweden